Massachusetts Senate's 4th Middlesex district in the United States is one of 40 legislative districts of the Massachusetts Senate. It covers portions of Middlesex county. Democrat Cindy Friedman of Arlington has represented the district since 2017.

Locales represented
The district includes the following localities:
 Arlington
 Billerica
 Burlington
 Lexington
 Woburn

Former locales

The district previously covered the following:

 Ashland, circa 1860s
 Framingham, circa 1860s
 Holliston, circa 1860s
 Hopkinton, circa 1860s
 Natick, circa 1860s
 Newton, circa 1860s
 Sherborn, circa 1860s
 Wayland, circa 1860s
 Weston, circa 1860s

Senators 
 George M. Brooks, circa 1859 
 Charles Dean
 James Cavanagh
 Alvin Bliss
 Angier Louis Goodwin, circa 1935 
 Sumner Gage Whittier, circa 1945 
 Fred Irvin Lamson, circa 1957-1969 
 John Bullock, circa 1975
 Samuel Rotondi, circa 1979 
 Richard Arnold Kraus, circa 1985 
 Robert Havern III, circa 1993-2002 
 Cindy F. Friedman, July 27, 2017-current

Images
Portraits of legislators

See also
 List of Massachusetts Senate elections
 List of Massachusetts General Courts
 List of former districts of the Massachusetts Senate
 Middlesex County districts of the Massachusetts House of Representatives: 1st, 2nd, 3rd, 4th, 5th, 6th, 7th, 8th, 9th, 10th, 11th, 12th, 13th, 14th, 15th, 16th, 17th, 18th, 19th, 20th, 21st, 22nd, 23rd, 24th, 25th, 26th, 27th, 28th, 29th, 30th, 31st, 32nd, 33rd, 34th, 35th, 36th, 37th

References

External links
 Ballotpedia
  (State Senate district information based on U.S. Census Bureau's American Community Survey).

Senate 
Government of Middlesex County, Massachusetts
Massachusetts Senate